Asaccus arnoldi is a species of lizard in the family Phyllodactylidae. It, along with all other species in the genus Asaccus, is endemic to the Hajar Mountains of northern Oman.

Taxonomy
Asaccas arnoldi was first formally named in 2017. The specific name, arnoldi, is in honor of British herpetologist Edwin Nicholas "Nick" Arnold.

Description
Asaccus arnoldi is the smallest species in the genus Asaccus. The maximum recorded snout-to-vent length (SVL) of A. arnoldi is only . It is most closely related to Asaccus gallagheri.

References

Asaccus
Reptiles of the Arabian Peninsula
Endemic fauna of Oman
Reptiles described in 2017